Spalgis is a genus of butterflies in the family Lycaenidae. Spalgis are found in the Australasian realm (New Guinea), the Indomalayan realm, and the Afrotropical realm. The genus was erected by Frederic Moore in 1879.

Species
Spalgis asmus Parsons, 1986
Spalgis baiongus Cantlie & Norman, 1960
Spalgis epius (Westwood, [1851])
Spalgis jacksoni Stempffer, 1967
Spalgis lemolea Druce, 1890
Spalgis takanamii Eliot, 1984
Spalgis tintinga (Boisduval, 1833)

References

External links
Images representing Spalgis at Bold

Miletinae
Lycaenidae genera
Taxa named by Frederic Moore